The 1998 Oakland mayoral election was held on June 2, 1998, to elect the mayor of Oakland, California. It saw the election of Jerry Brown, the former Governor of California, as mayor.

Brown won an outright majority in the first round of the election, forgoing the need for a runoff.

Candidates
Hugh E. Bassette
Leo Bazile, attorney, former member of the Oakland City Council, candidate for mayor in 1990
Jerry Brown, former Governor of California (1975-1983), former Chair of the California Democratic Party (1989-1991), former Secretary of State of California (1971-1975), candidate for the Democratic nomination for President of the United States in 1976, 1980, 1992
Ignacio De La Fuente, member of the Oakland City Council since 1992
Ces Butner, businessman
Ed Blakely, urban planner, consultant to mayor Elihu Harris
Maria G. Harper
Mary V. King, Alameda County Supervisor and 1994 mayoral candidate
Audrey Rice Oliver
Shannon Reeves, head of Oakland NAACP (Republican)
Hector Reyna, perennial candidate

Campaign
Incumbent mayor Elihu Harris opted against running for a third term.

Brown entered what was already a crowded mayoral field in late October 1997, instantly becoming the race's frontrunner. A poll published in The Montclarion right before he formally entered the race had showed Brown garnering 47% in a hypothetical race.

Brown identified himself to be an independent, having declared himself to have left the Democratic Party.

Brown ran under the campaign slogan "Oaklanders First". He campaign actively, holding many events.

Brown was endorsed by, among others, former Berkeley, California mayor Gus Newport.

Brown was the only white candidate running in the race. Oakland was a majority minority city. Brown won a majority of the black vote.

Brown was heavily anticipated to win the election.

While Oakland had a weak mayor form of government, Brown was also campaigning to change this. He supported Measure X, a measure on the ballot in November 1998 which would change the city's model of government to a strong mayor for a period of 6 years. Ultimately, in November, Oakland's electorate voted by a landslide margin of 3 to 1 in support of Measure X, switching the city to a strong mayor system of governance prior to Brown taking office. Years later, in 2004, a referendum permanently extending Measure X later was passed, after failing to pass in 2002, making permanent the city's shift to the strong mayor model of governance.

Results

References 

Oakland
1998
Oakland
Jerry Brown